George "Frank" Franklin Todd (October 18, 1869 – August 11, 1919) was an American professional baseball player who played in four games for the Louisville Colonels during the  season.
He was born in Aberdeen, Maryland and died in Havre De Grace, Maryland at the age of 49.

External links

Major League Baseball pitchers
Baseball players from Maryland
Louisville Colonels players
1869 births
1919 deaths
19th-century baseball players
Pawtucket Phenoms players
Millville (minor league baseball) players
Pawtucket Tigers players
Pawtucket Colts players
People from Aberdeen, Maryland